Afraflacilla karinae is a jumping spider species in the genus Afraflacilla that lives in South Africa. A published description of the female was first made in 2011, but the male has yet to be described. It is most closely related to Afraflacilla elegans.

References

Endemic fauna of South Africa
Salticidae
Spiders described in 2011
Spiders of South Africa
Taxa named by Wanda Wesołowska